Belle Air Sh.p.k (stylized as belleair) was a privately owned Albanian low-cost airline headquartered in Tirana.

History
Belle Air was founded in 2005. It ceased operations on 24 November 2013 stating economic difficulties. Their fleet has been returned to the lessors. Belle Air Europe was a sister company to the airline, founded in 2009 and based in Ancona, Italy. It ceased operations two days after the parent company.

Destinations

Belle Air operated international flights on scheduled services to several cities in Belgium, Germany, Greece, Italy, Kosovo, Switzerland and the UK out of Tirana International Airport Nënë Tereza.

Fleet

As of November 2013, at the time when it ceased operations, the Belle Air fleet consisted of the following aircraft:

See also 
 List of defunct airlines of Albania

References

External links

 Official website

 
Defunct airlines of Albania
Defunct European low-cost airlines
Airlines established in 2005
Airlines disestablished in 2013
2005 establishments in Albania
2013 disestablishments in Albania